Shanureh (also Romanized as Shānūreh and Shānavareh; also known as Shāh-e Nāwāreh, Shāh-i-Nawāreh, Shāhnavazeh, and Shah Nooreh) is a village in Panjeh Ali Rural District, in the Central District of Qorveh County, Kurdistan Province, Iran. At the 2006 census, its population was 772, in 187 families. The village is populated by Kurds.

References 

Towns and villages in Qorveh County
Kurdish settlements in Kurdistan Province